Ad-Dustour or Al-Dustour ( "The Constitution") may refer to:
 Al-Dustour (Egypt), an Egyptian newspaper
 Ad-Dustour (Jordan), a Jordanian newspaper